is a commuter railway station on the Enoshima Electric Railway (Enoden) located in the Inamuragasaki neighborhood of the city of Kamakura, Kanagawa Prefecture, Japan.

Lines
Inamuragasaki Station is served by the Enoshima Electric Railway Main Line and is 6.8 kilometers from the terminus of the line at Fujisawa Station.

Station layout
The station consists of a single island platform serving two tracks, with a level crossing. The station is attended.

Platforms

History 
Inamuragasaki Station was opened on 1 April 1904.

Station numbering was introduced to the Enoshima Electric Railway January 2014 with Inamuragasaki being assigned station number EN10.

Passenger statistics
In fiscal 2019, the station was used by an average of 4,309 passengers daily, making it the 7th used of the 15 Enoden stations 

The average passenger figures for previous years (boarding passengers only) are as shown below.

Surrounding area
Japan National Route 134 
 Cape Inamuragasaki

See also
 List of railway stations in Japan

References

External links

 Enoden station information 

Railway stations in Kanagawa Prefecture
Railway stations in Japan opened in 1904
Kamakura, Kanagawa